Welney is a village and civil parish in the Fens of England, and the county of Norfolk. The county boundary with Cambridgeshire is adjacent, with the city of Cambridge   to the south.
 
Welney is  immediately to the west of the Old Bedford River, River Delph and New Bedford River, which are all parallel channels and are here crossed by the A1101 road.

Welney is on the Ouse Washes, an area of wildlife conservation. WWT Welney, near the village, is a nature reserve in the care of the Wildfowl and Wetlands Trust. Nearby, there are also the RSPB Ouse Washes, a reserve managed by the Royal Society for the Protection of Birds.

For the purposes of local government, the parish falls within the district of King's Lynn and West Norfolk.

History 
In the 14th century, Welney was called Wellenhe, meaning "a river called Welle" (the old name of the Old Croft River). In the 18th century Woad was grown in the parish.
In 1820 a road from Welney across the wash, to the hundred-Foot river, where a ferry-boat was established opposite the public-house of Thomas Golding, formerly Washington's, this  provided a direct into Lincolnshire through Wisbech from Bury St Edmunds, Ely and Cambridge.
In the second half of the 19th century Welney became significant for its skaters. On 21 February 1855, Turkey Smart of Welney became champion skater of the Fens. James Smart of Welney became champion on 21 January 1891. William Loveday of Welney came 2nd to James Aveling of March in the amateur championship.

St Mary's Church in Welney is dedicated to the Virgin Mary.

Further reading

References

External links

.
Information from Genuki Norfolk on Welney.
Welney's website

Villages in Norfolk
King's Lynn and West Norfolk
Civil parishes in Norfolk